The Laune Viaduct is a historic bridge in Killorglin, County Kerry, Ireland.

The viaduct was located along the Great Southern and Western Railway's branch line from Farranfore to Valentia Harbour.

Opened in 1885, the five-span rock-hewn limestone railway viaduct over the River Laune has single-arch sections to the east and to the west with limestone and red brick voussoirs. A three-span section leads to the centre with bow-string cast-iron girders on tapered limestone piers. The bridge was designed by S. G. Frazier. The three metal spans are each 95 ft long, each consisting of pairs of twin cross braced bow-string girders of part N-truss and part latticed members. The piers and bridge abutments are made of local limestone. The bridge was repaired in 1950 and closed in 1960. Renovations in 1993 were made to accommodate its use as footbridge.

The bridge is a registered heritage site, number 21400701, by the National Inventory of Architectural Heritage. It is known locally as the "Metal Bridge".

References 

Railway bridges in the Republic of Ireland
Former railway bridges
Buildings and structures in County Kerry
Former bridges in Ireland